The Subic–Clark–Tarlac Expressway (SCTEX), signed as E1 and E4 of the Philippine expressway network and R-8 of the Metro Manila arterial road network, is controlled-access toll expressway in the Central Luzon region of the Philippines. From its northern terminus in Tarlac City to its southern terminus at Tipo in Hermosa, Bataan, the SCTEX serves as one of the main expressways in Luzon. The expressway is also connected to the Central Luzon Link Expressway, North Luzon Expressway, Tarlac–Pangasinan–La Union Expressway, and the Subic Freeport Expressway. The Subic–Clark–Tarlac Expressway was constructed to provide a more efficient transport corridor between Subic Bay Freeport, Clark, and the Central Techno Park in Tarlac, foster development on the municipalities served, and connect major infrastructures such as the Subic Seaport and Clark International Airport.

The expressway also serves as a major utility corridor, carrying various high voltage overhead power lines through densely populated areas where acquisition and designation of right of way or power line alignment and lands for their associated structures is impractical. A notable power line using the expressway's right of way for most or part of the route is the Concepcion–Clark transmission line from Clark North Exit in Mabalacat, Pampanga to Concepcion, Tarlac.

Built by the Bases Conversion and Development Authority (BCDA), a government owned and controlled corporation, construction of the expressway started on April 5, 2005. Commercial operations then started on April 28, 2008, with the opening of the Subic–Clark Segment and Zone A of the portion of Clark-Tarlac Segment. The opening of Zones B and C of the remaining Clark–Tarlac Segment on July 25, 2008, signaled the full operations of the SCTEX.

Route description 

The Subic–Clark–Tarlac Expressway runs northwest from Bataan and runs through the provinces of Pampanga and Tarlac. The entirety of the SCTEX is built as a four-lane expressway mostly laid out on embankment, with some sections using cuts to traverse hilly areas. The expressway also crosses the four rivers in Central Luzon: the Dinalupihan River in Bataan, the Gumain River in Floridablanca and the Pasig–Potrero River in Porac, both in Pampanga, and the Sacobia River in Bamban, Tarlac. All exits require toll payment, and toll plazas are laid on the termini of the expressway.

SCTEX starts at the east end of the Subic-Tipo Expressway in Barangay Tipo in Hermosa, Bataan. The expressway is built parallel to the Jose Abad Santos Avenue (N3) until Dinalupihan Exit, where the expressway curves northward and tracks the Angeles-Porac-Floridablanca-Dinalupihan Road as it follows a mostly straight route. The expressway then curves to the northeast before Floridablanca Exit. It curves toward the northwest and back to the northeast before Porac Exit. It then curves eastward and then northward near Clark Freeport and Clark International Airport. Clark South Exit, which serves those areas, lies near Mabalacat Interchange, with the exits being one kilometer apart from each other. The segment ends at a trumpet interchange in Mabalacat, where it meets the Clark Spur Road that links SCTEX with North Luzon Expressway (NLEX) and crosses over MacArthur Highway.
The expressway becomes part of Radial Road 8 at a trumpet interchange in Mabalacat, where its main destination changes to Tarlac City and Baguio. The roadway runs at the boundary of Clark Freeport and Mabalacat city proper, where the Philippine National Railways (PNR) North Main Line to Dagupan and San Fernando, La Union also lies. MacArthur Highway (N2) parallels the expressway up to Tarlac City.

Leaving Clark Freeport, Clark North Exit comes before the expressway, where it curves and then crosses MacArthur Highway at Barangay Dolores, where a half-partial cloverleaf interchange, serving only northbound traffic, connects the two. Approaching Tarlac, the expressway crosses over the Sacobia River through a bridge mentioned before. The first service areas on the expressway, one serving northbound traffic, and the other serving southbound traffic, apart by one kilometer, comes before Concepcion Exit. The expressway passes near the poblacion of Concepcion, then over agricultural land of Tarlac City. Hacienda Luisita Exit, that serves Hacienda Luisita as well as connecting MacArthur Highway and serving barangays along its connecting road, comes before the northern end of the expressway at Tarlac City Exit. A new toll plaza built on the main route serves Tarlac City Exit, whose toll gates are removed with its opening. The exit serves an interchange with the Central Luzon Link Expressway (CLLEX). Past Tarlac City Exit, Subic–Clark–Tarlac Expressway becomes Tarlac–Pangasinan–La Union Expressway (TPLEX) northward.

History 

Construction was started in 2005 under the government of his successor, President Gloria Macapagal Arroyo. It is the longest continuous tollway in the Philippines that connects Subic, Clark, and Tarlac.

The original project for the expressway is divided into segments, the  Subic-Clark segment, and the  Clark–Tarlac segment. The contractors for the project are a joint venture of Kajima, Obayashi, JFE Engineering, and Mitsubishi Heavy Industries, for the Subic-Clark segment, and a joint venture of Hazama, Taisei, and Nippon Steel, for the Clark-Tarlac segment. Consultation were provided by a joint venture of Oriental Consultant, Katahira & Engineering International, and Nippon Koei Co. Ltd.

The indirect costs of ₱7.146 billion include land acquisition, consultancy services, project management expenses and taxes and duties. Financing costs of ₱2.074 billion include the Department of Finance guarantee fee and JBIC loan interest during the construction period. Toll Fees are approved by the Toll Regulatory Board (TRB)

On March 18, 2008, at exactly 1 pm, President Gloria Macapagal Arroyo opened the Subic–Clark segment of the expressway for a Holy Week dry run. This helped motorists traveling to Zambales and Bataan for Holy Week. The dry run was free and available for class 1 vehicles only. The Holy Week dry run was from March 18, 1 p.m. to 5:30 p.m and March 19 to 24, 5:30 a.m. to 5:30 p.m.; operating hours were limited as no street lights were installed that time.

On April 28, 2008, at exactly 12 noon, BCDA opened the Subic–Clark segment to all vehicles. BCDA said that travel time from Manila to Subic via North Luzon Expressway would now only take 1 hour and 40 minutes while the travel time from Clark to Subic would only take 40 minutes. The Dolores exit (formerly Clark North A exit) was also opened, which connects to MacArthur Highway.

On July 25, 2008, the BCDA announced the opening of the Clark–Tarlac segment of the expressway. Travel time from Clark to Tarlac was reduced to only 25 minutes and to travel the entire length of the SCTEx would only take about 1 hour. At the same time, the travel time from Manila to Tarlac City via NLEx and the SCTEx would only take 1 hour and 25 minutes.

Operations and maintenance 
The expressway is part of the Bases Conversion and Development Authority's Subic–Clark–Tarlac Expressway Project or SCTEP, which aims to connect the ecozones of Subic and Clark. The joint-venture of First Philippine Infrastructure Development Corporation (FPIDC), Tollways Management Corporation and Egis Projects, the same concessionaires of the North Luzon Expressway, would handle all the operations and maintenance of the expressway.  The First Philippine Infrastructure Development Corporation is a subsidiary of First Philippine Holdings, a holding company under the Lopez Group of Companies with core investments in power and tollways, and strategic initiatives in property and manufacturing. The FPIDC was eventually sold to Metro Pacific Investments Corporation in 2008.

The SCTEx business and operating agreement between the BCDA and the Manila North Tollways Corporation (MNTC), and its holdings companies Metro Pacific Tollways Corporation (MPTC) and Metro Pacific Investments Corporation (MPIC), was signed July 25, 2011.  Under the business and operating agreement, MNTC will operate and manage SCTEx for 33 years, while relieving BCDA of the heavy financial burden of paying the ₱34-billion debt to the Japan International Cooperation Agency (JICA). By virtue of the Agreement, the SCTEx can be considered as having been built at no cost to Government.

Toll 

The toll system of Subic–Clark–Tarlac Expressway is a closed road system that uses cards with magnetic strips, and from March 2016, electronic toll collection, using the Easytrip system by its concessionaire, Manila North Tollways Corporation (now NLEX Corporation), is introduced, eventually integrating the toll system of the expressway with North Luzon Expressway's. Before March 2016, the toll system is completely independent, with toll collection from NLEx and vice versa being done at a toll plaza on Clark Spur Road in Mabalacat, until the structure's demolition following the toll system integration.

In March 2016, the integration of the North Luzon Expressway and the SCTEx was completed, in time for the Holy Week exodus. Among the integration plans which costed 650 million pesos are the reduction of toll collection stops, construction of additional toll plazas and the conversion of the electronic toll collection of the two expressways into a single system.

Also, with the government's thrust towards toll road interoperability, Autosweep of the San Miguel Corporation which operates SLEx, Skyway, STAR Tollway, NAIAX, and TPLEx has been accepted as a mode of payment in SCTEx since March 2018.

The toll rates, by kilometer travelled and vehicle class are as follows:

Services 

From 2016, the SCTEx has two service areas in Concepcion, Tarlac, north of the Sacobia River. One of the service areas is on the northbound lanes and the other one is on the southbound lanes. The northbound service area is composed of a PTT gas station and a 7-Eleven store. The southbound service area is composed of a Seaoil gas station and CityMall shopping mall. Both service areas include a future expansion to accommodate additional retail and parking space.

Exits

Clark Spur Road

New Clark City Access Road

Notes

References

External links 

 Subic–Clark–Tarlac Expressway
 Bases Conversion and Development Authority

Toll roads in the Philippines
Roads in Bataan
Roads in Pampanga
Roads in Tarlac